Bjørnsund Lighthouse is a coastal lighthouse in Hustadvika Municipality in Møre og Romsdal county, Norway.

History
The lighthouse was first established in 1871 and it was automated in 1986. The lighthouse was listed as a protected site in 2000.

In 1977, a Racon beacon was established.

See also

Lighthouses in Norway
List of lighthouses in Norway

References

External links
Picture of Bjørnsund Lighthouse
Norsk Fyrhistorisk Forening 

Lighthouses completed in 1871
Lighthouses in Møre og Romsdal
Listed lighthouses in Norway
Hustadvika (municipality)